Higham Gobion is a village and former civil parish, now in the parish of Shillington, in the Central Bedfordshire district, in the ceremonial county of Bedfordshire, England. It is located between the villages of Shillington and Barton-le-Clay. In 1961 the parish had a population of 28. On 1 April 1984 the parish was abolished and merged with Shillington. It was in the hundred of Flitt.

This hilltop village, which consists of a church, farm and small industrial unit and one or two houses, gets the second part of its name from the Gobion family, who resided in this area after the Norman invasion of 1066. In the fields a mile north-east of the church are triangular earthworks and medieval fishponds, all that remain today of a substantial deserted medieval village. Roman pottery has also been found in the field east of the former Rectory. 

The Anglican church, dedicated to St. Margaret, dates from c.1300, but was much restored during the Victorian period. It contains a monument to Dr. Edmund Castell, who died in 1674 and was a Professor of Arabic at Cambridge. He was a rector at Higham during the last years of his life and lived in the adjoining (and much restored), former rectory. The church is part of the Diocese of St Albans.

See also
Higham Gobion Castle

References

External links 

 
 St. Margaret Church

Villages in Bedfordshire
Former civil parishes in Bedfordshire
Central Bedfordshire District